Stanley Army Airfield is a former World War II airfield located on Oahu, Hawaii. It was a temporary airfield, used for fighter planes as part of the island's defense. Today it is the site of the Schofield Barracks parade ground, which is named after Frederick C. Weyand, a former commander of the U.S. 25th Infantry Division.

History
United States Army Air Corps Curtiss P-40 Warhawk units based at Stanley Field:
318th Fighter Group's 19th Fighter Squad 
15th Fighter Group's 18th Fighter Squad

See also

 Hawaii World War II Army Airfields

References

External links

Airfields of the United States Army Air Forces in Hawaii
Buildings and structures in Honolulu County, Hawaii
Defunct airports in Hawaii
History of Oahu